Josep Masgoret i Marcó (Miramar (Alt Camp), c. 1820–1883) was one of the main warlords of the Carlists of  Catalonia in the Second Carlist War.

Although he was one of the most wealthy owners of Tarragona, he decided to abandon his family and in 1838, was appointed commander of Tarragona with Vall and Llarg de Copons. He participated in the Seven Years' War, which earned him a considerable reputation. After the war he was promoted to brigadier general. He went into exile for some time, but returned to fight in the War of the Early Risers (Second Carlist War) (1846–49) on 1 April 1848 as commanding general of the Carlist forces. He organized a form of Council of Catalonia to solve administrative economic, civil and military problems. In early 1849, seeing the impossibility of winning the war, he went into exile in France where he later died in 1883.

References 
 La guerra dels Matiners a Catalunya (1846–1849). Robert Vallverdú i Martí Publicacions de l'Abadia de Montserrat 2002 page 402
 Diccionario histórico del carlismo. Josep Carles Clemente. Pamiela 2006. page 328

1820s births
1883 deaths
People from Alt Camp
Carlists
Military personnel from Catalonia